Russell Camilleri (born November 13, 1936) is an American wrestler. He competed at the 1960 Summer Olympics and the 1964 Summer Olympics.

References

1936 births
Living people
American male sport wrestlers
Olympic wrestlers of the United States
Wrestlers at the 1960 Summer Olympics
Wrestlers at the 1964 Summer Olympics
Sportspeople from New York City